Armancourt may refer to:

 Armancourt, Oise, a commune of the Oise département in France.
 Armancourt, Somme, a commune of the Somme département in France.